Kévin Van Melsen (born 1 April 1987) is a Belgian former racing cyclist, who competed as a professional from 2009 to 2022. He now works as a directeur sportif for UCI Continental team . He rode at the 2014 UCI Road World Championships. In July 2019, he was named in the startlist for the 2019 Tour de France.

Major results

2005
 1st  Road race, National Junior Road Championships
2009
 5th Grand Prix Criquielion
2010
 3rd Memorial Van Coningsloo
2014
 1st  Mountains classification Tour de Wallonie
 1st  Mountains classification Tour du Poitou-Charentes
2018
 7th Polynormande
 8th Grand Prix de la Ville de Lillers

Grand Tour general classification results timeline

References

External links
 

1987 births
Living people
Belgian male cyclists
People from Verviers
Cyclists from Liège Province